Massonia etesionamibensis (syn. Whiteheadia etesionamibensis) is a species of plant that is endemic to Namibia.  Its natural habitat is rocky areas.

References

 

etesionamibensis
Flora of Namibia
Least concern plants
Taxonomy articles created by Polbot
Taxobox binomials not recognized by IUCN